Willughbeia angustifolia is a species of flowering plant, a woody monoecious vine in the dogbane family, that is native to Southeast Asia.

Name
Local vernacular names include gerit-gerit, gitaan, serapit and akar kubal madu.

Description
The vine grows up to 60 m in height into the canopies of forest trees. The oval leaves are smooth, 2.6–20.5 cm long by 0.9–7 cm wide. The axillary inflorescences comprise short cymes of small white flowers. The fruits are round, yellow to orange berries 3–14 cm in diameter, with a latex-filled epicarp, containing small seeds embedded in a sweet orange sarcotesta.

Distribution and habitat
The species occurs in the Nicobar Islands, Malay Peninsula, Singapore, Sumatra, Borneo and the Maluku Islands, where it is found in lowland and hill mixed dipterocarp forest up to an elevation of 500 m.

Usage
The edible fruits are valued for their flavour, reminiscent of strawberries and raspberries, and are often sold in local markets.

References

 
angustifolia
Flora of the Nicobar Islands
Flora of Thailand
Flora of Malaya
Flora of Singapore
Flora of Sumatra
Flora of Borneo
Flora of the Maluku Islands
Fruits originating in Asia
Plants described in 1861
Taxa named by Friedrich Anton Wilhelm Miquel